Greater St. Albert Catholic Schools or Greater St. Albert Roman Catholic Separate School District No. 734 is a separate school board serving St. Albert, Morinville, and Legal, Alberta, Canada.

History

Quick facts 
 Greater St. Albert Catholic Schools formed in 1995 after the amalgamation of three historic school jurisdictions. We are the 4th largest Catholic jurisdiction in Alberta.
 Greater St. Albert Catholic Schools was the first jurisdiction to offer a cyber school.  St. Gabriel High School marks 14 years of success providing online learning opportunities for Alberta and overseas students.
 Greater St. Albert Catholic Schools was the first jurisdiction in Alberta to offer the highly acclaimed Learning Through the Arts program developed by the Royal Conservatory of Music.

2013 - 2014 School Year
 Superintendent:  Mr. David Keohane
 Schools:  16 located in 3 municipalities (Morinville, Legal & St. Albert) with 1 outreach location (St. Albert)
 Students:  6000
 Teachers:  378 (371 in schools + 7 in district operations)
 Total Staff:  579 (552 in schools + 27 in district operations)
 Trustees:  7 (4 in St. Albert ward; 2 in Morinville ward; and 1 in Legal ward)
 Board Chair:  Mrs. Joan Crockett
 Budget: $67.2 million

Board of Trustees 
 vacant – St. Albert Ward
 Joan Crockett – St. Albert Ward, 
 Serena Shaw – St. Albert Ward
 Rosaleen McEvoy – St. Albert Ward, Vice Chair
 Cathy Proulx - Legal Ward
 Noreen Radford – Morinville Ward, Board Chair
 Rene Tremblay – Morinville Ward

Programs 
 Kindergarten
 Pre-Kindergarten
 Faith Education
 French Immersion
 International Baccalaureate (IB)
 Learning Through the Arts 
 Sports Academy

Schools 

St. Albert:
 Albert Lacombe School 
 Bertha Kennedy Catholic Community School
 Ecole Father Jan
 Ecole Marie Poburan
 J.J. Nearing Catholic Elementary School
 Neil M. Ross Catholic School
 Vital Grandin Catholic School
 Richard S. Fowler Junior High School
 Vincent J. Maloney Catholic Junior High School
 Ecole Secondaire Sainte Marguerite d’Youville
 St. Albert Catholic High School
 St. Gabriel High School
 Greater St. Albert Sports Academy

Legal:
 Legal School

Morinville:
 Ecole Notre Dame Elementary 
 Georges H. Primeau Middle School
 Morinville Community High School

Alleged human rights violations

In October, 2009 it was reported that a man formerly employed by the district had filed a human rights complaint against the district. The man, Jan Buterman, claimed that in 2008 he had been removed from the district's substitute teaching list after he declared his intention to transition from a female to male. In a letter to Buterman dated October 14, 2008 the division's deputy superintendent, Steve Bayus stated "Since you made a personal choice to change your gender, which is contrary to Catholic teachings, we have had to remove you from the substitute teacher list." As of October 15, 2009, the Alberta Human Rights Commission had accepted Buterman's complaint.

2011 Morinville controversy 
One anomaly of the school system in Alberta is that the Town of Morinville has only a public Catholic high school (part of the Greater St. Albert Catholic Regional Division), and no secular or Protestant high schools of any kind, when the surrounding Sturgeon County, is a part of the public Sturgeon School Division. This led, in 2011, for non-Catholic parents to start an advocacy campaign to secularize education in Morinville.

References

 http://www.gsacrd.ab.ca 
 http://education.alberta.ca/parents/educationsys/factsheets.aspx

External links
 Greater St. Albert Roman Catholic Separate School district No. 734

School districts in Alberta
St. Albert, Alberta